Radha My Darling is a Telugu film starring Chiranjeevi.

References

External links
 

1980s Telugu-language films